Khormoj (also Romanized as Khormūj, Khormoj, and Khūrmūj) is a city in the Central District of Dashti County, Bushehr province, Iran, and serves as capital of the county.  At the 2006 census, its population was 31,667 in 6,966 households. The following census in 2011 counted 34,944 people in 8,777 households. The latest census in 2016 showed a population of 40,722 people in 11,537 households.

It is the only city in the Central District of the county. Persians constitute 95% of the inhabitants, and the majority speaks the Dashti dialect. In 2006 Khormuj comprised 13 villages: Derāzi (administrative center), Zizār, Ahshām Qā'edhā, Faqih Hasanān, Bāgh-e Vahš, Heydari, Zāyer Abbās, Verāvi, Miānkherra, Chārak, Chāvushi, Chahla, and Kolol. T The narrow river Shur traverses the valley, 7 km to the west of the town.

See also

2013 Bushehr earthquake

References

Cities in Bushehr Province
Populated places in Dashti County